Gillings is a surname. Notable people with the surname include:

Dennis Gillings (born 1944), British-born American statistician and entrepreneur
Mireille Gillings (born 1963), Canadian neurobiologist and entrepreneur
Richard Gillings (born 1945), Archdeacon of Macclesfield from 1994 to 2010
Zoe Gillings (born 1985), Manx snowboarder